Midlake is an American folk rock band from Denton, Texas, formed in 1999. The band consists of Eric Pulido, McKenzie Smith, Scott Lee, Eric Nichelson, Jesse Chandler, and Joey McClellan.

In 2012, vocalist, guitarist and primary songwriter Tim Smith left the band during the recording of its fourth studio album. Following his departure, guitarist and backing vocalist Eric Pulido filled Smith's vacated role, and the band started afresh with its recordings, releasing Antiphon in 2013.

The band first gained popularity in Europe, signing to Bella Union Records and later playing at festivals such as Les Inrockuptibles, Wintercase, End of the Road and South by Southwest.

History

Formation 
Midlake was formed in 1999 by a group of jazz students at the University of North Texas College of Music. The original lineup consisted of Tim Smith (vocals, guitars, keyboards), McKenzie Smith (drums), Paul Alexander (bass), Eric Nichelson (guitar), and Evan Jacobs (keyboards). Their initial work – under the name "The Cornbread All-Stars" – consisted of funk/jazz explorations heavily influenced by Herbie Hancock. Later, the band began to lean more toward an indie rock sound. Tim Smith quit playing saxophone and began writing songs that were heavily influenced by bands such as Jethro Tull, Radiohead, Björk, and Grandaddy, artists who experiment, while still remaining accessible.

Speaking about the band's influences, Smith commented:

In an interview with Reverb Magazines Nick Milligan, Smith said of the band's origins:

 Member changes and The Trials of Van Occupanther 
Jacobs left the band and Eric Nichelson took over on keyboard. Jason Upshaw joined the band as a guitarist. Live recordings from this period, recorded at Denton's Panhandle House studio, were never released as the band felt they had moved beyond the material. Not long before the band recorded their debut EP, Milkmaid Grand Army, Upshaw was replaced on guitars by Eric Pulido, a longtime friend of drummer Smith. Their debut full-length album, 2004's Bamnan and Slivercork, was recorded at home in Denton, Texas and mastered at Abbey Road Studios. It showed a move in the direction of lo-fi psychedelic electronica, embracing influences such as Grandaddy and The Flaming Lips. The album even caught the ear of skateboarder-turned-actor Jason Lee, who produced and directed the music video for the song "Balloon Maker", and who continues to support and promote the band.

In 2006, after nearly a year-and-a-half of recording and re-recording, they completed their second release for Bella Union, The Trials of Van Occupanther. The album was a venture into classic-rock revivalism, with a sound reminiscent of Bob Welch-era Fleetwood Mac. The album was met with generally positive reviews. In January 2009, their song "Bandits" was featured in an episode of the FOX television drama Fringe.

 The Courage of Others 
In February 2010, the band released The Courage of Others, which garnered generally good reviews, notably "album of the month" in Mojo. The album, which showcased Tim Smith's brooding baritone vocals, had a slower pace and denser musical arrangements inspired by British prog-folk acts like Pentangle, Fairport Convention, and The Incredible String Band.

In a 2010 interview with Reverb Magazine, Tim Smith told editor Nick Milligan:

Smith also said in the Reverb Magazine interview that his favourite song from The Courage of Others was "Small Mountain":

Of The Courage of Others, Tim Smith also said:

 Departure of Tim Smith 
Though the group spent much of 2011 and 2012 recording at the farm in Buffalo, Texas where The Courage of Others was tracked, the recording process stalled. "We knew something was missing," guitarist Eric Pulido said. Midlake played a handful of live dates and debuted new material in 2012, including an appearance at Bella Union's 15th Anniversary End Of The Road Festival on August 31, 2012. Just a few months later, lead vocalist and songwriter Tim Smith announced he was leaving Midlake to form a new project called Harp. Rather than divide the recorded material among the two bands, Midlake abandoned the two years' worth of recordings with Smith and began again from scratch, writing and recording a new full-length album in just six months.

 Antiphon and For the Sake of Bethel Woods 
In August 2013, Midlake announced the release date for their fourth full-length album, Antiphon, due November 5, 2013 on ATO Records in North America and November 4, 2013 on Bella Union in Europe. Guitarist Eric Pulido stepped into the role of lead vocalist on Antiphon, with backing vocals from Alexander and new members Jesse Chandler (keyboards, piano, flute) and Joey McClellan (guitars). "Antiphon is the most honest representation of the band as a whole, as opposed to one person's vision that we were trying to facilitate," Pulido remarked in the album's press release, which characterizes the new music as "free-flowing in feel, concise in structure ... it's very much Midlake, but uncannily rebooted, and relaxed." In addition to the lineup change, Antiphon marks Midlake's first release on Dave Matthews' ATO Records label, also home to My Morning Jacket, Caitlin Rose, and Stars.

On October 25, 2021, Midlake announced the release date for their fifth full-length album, For the Sake of Bethel Woods, due March 18, 2022 on ATO Records in North America and on Bella Union in Europe.

 Collaborations 

Tim Smith is featured on the forthcoming 2021 Lost Horizons double album release, "In Quiet Moments", writing lyrics, melodies and performing vocals for the song "Grey Tower" and the 2017 Lost Horizons''' album "Ojalá", writing lyrics and singing the song "She Led Me Away". He also appears on Chemical Brothers' 2007 album We Are the Night, contributing vocals to the track "The Pills Won't Help You Now".

In 2007 Robert Gomez and Midlake guitarist Eric Pulido recorded a version of Feliz Navidad for a "Merry Christmas from Bella Union" CD.

Midlake also co-produced, engineered and played on an album for their friend John Grant, former singer with label mates The Czars. The album, Queen of Denmark, was released in April 2010. In an interview with the UK music website The Line of Best Fit, Bella Union boss Simon Raymonde said:

BNQT, led by Eric Pulido, is a collaboration between members of Midlake and Ben Bridwell (Band of Horses), Alex Kapranos (Franz Ferdinand), Fran Healy (Travis), and Jason Lytle (Grandaddy). Their first album, titled Volume 1, was released on 28 April 2017 via Dualtone/Bella Union.

 Discography 

 Albums 

 Singles and EPs 
 2001: Milkmaid Grand Army (EP)
 2005: Balloon Maker (EP)
 2005: Kingfish Pies
 2006: Roscoe
 2006: Young Bride
 2006: Head Home
 2007: Oak & Julian (iTunes-only EP)
 2009: Acts Of Man (12" single)
 2010: Fortune (EP)
 2010: Children Of The Grounds
 2010: Fortune
 2011: Am I Going Insane (12" Single, Ltd)
 2014: It's Going Down
 2016: The Old And The Young
 2016: Antiphon
 2016: The Fairest Way

 Music videos 
 Balloon Maker
 The Old And The Young

 Compilation albums 
 2011: Late Night Tales: Midlake Collaborations 
 2017: BNQT – Volume 1, (Dualtone/Bella Union)

 Solo projects 
 2018: Two Medicine (Paul Alexander) – Astropsychosis, Bella Union
 2019: E.B. The Younger (Eric Pulido) – To Each His Own, Bella Union
 2021: Pneumatic Tubes (Jesse Chandler) - Sunfrost 2022: Pneumatic Tubes (Jesse Chandler) - A Letter from TreeTops''

References

External links 
 
 

Indie rock musical groups from Texas
Musical quintets
Musical groups from Denton, Texas
American indie folk groups
Bella Union artists
ATO Records artists
1999 establishments in Texas